The Lambda Orionis Cluster (also known as the Collinder 69) is an open star cluster located north-west of the star Betelgeuse in the constellation of Orion. Included within the cluster is a double star named Meissa. With the rest of Orion, it is visible from the middle of August in the morning sky, to late April before Orion becomes too close to the Sun to be seen well. It can be seen from both the northern hemisphere and the southern hemisphere.

Description
On average it crosses the plane every 33.3 million years.

The star cluster is young and contains a large number of low-mass stars, some T Tauri stars and brown dwarfs. One notable member is LOri167, which is a wide binary consisting of a potential planetary-mass object and a brown dwarf. Observations of the star cluster with the Spitzer Space Telescope have shown that 25% of the low-mass stars and 40% of the substellar objects are surrounded by a circumstellar disk. Two of these being actively photoevaporated by Meissa.

Molecular ring and cluster evolution 

The cluster might have formed in the central region of an elongated cloud, which is supported by the distribution of pre-main-sequence star candidates, which are concentrated in the cluster and nearby regions in an elongated shape. Massive OB stars and low-mass stars formed in the central regions of these clouds. The low-mass stars closest to the massive stars likely lost their circumstellar disks due to photoevaporation. Many low-mass stars parsecs away were unaffected by this and represent the current population of low-mass stars with a circumstellar disk. The cluster is surrounded by a large molecular ring, called the Lambda Orionis ring. This was interpreted as a remnant of a supernova that exploded one million years ago. The supernova blast encountered the clouds and gas in the region and the blast dispersed the parent core, creating the molecular ring.

See also 
Other celestial bodies included in the constellation Orion:
 Orion Nebula
 Horsehead Nebula
 Barnard 30

References 

 Sky Atlas 2000.0 Second Edition

External links 
 

Orion (constellation)
Open clusters